Tom Staahle (born 30 December 1972) is a Norwegian politician for the Progress Party.

He served as a deputy representative to the Parliament of Norway from Akershus during the terms 2005–2009 and 2009–2013. He hails from Ullensaker where he has chaired the local party.

References

1972 births
Living people
People from Ullensaker
Deputy members of the Storting
Progress Party (Norway) politicians
Akershus politicians
21st-century Norwegian politicians